Sitno may refer to the following places in Poland and Slovakia:
Sitno, Lower Silesian Voivodeship (south-west Poland)
Sitno, Bydgoszcz County in Kuyavian-Pomeranian Voivodeship (north-central Poland)
Sitno, Golub-Dobrzyń County in Kuyavian-Pomeranian Voivodeship (north-central Poland)
Sitno, Sępólno County in Kuyavian-Pomeranian Voivodeship (north-central Poland)
Sitno, Wąbrzeźno County in Kuyavian-Pomeranian Voivodeship (north-central Poland)
Sitno, Biała Podlaska County in Lublin Voivodeship (east Poland)
Sitno, Radzyń Podlaski County in Lublin Voivodeship (east Poland)
Sitno, Zamość County in Lublin Voivodeship (east Poland)
Sitno, Masovian Voivodeship (east-central Poland)
Sitno, Pomeranian Voivodeship (north Poland)
Sitno, Warmian-Masurian Voivodeship (north Poland)
Sitno, Gryfino County in West Pomeranian Voivodeship (north-west Poland)
Sitno, Gmina Myślibórz in West Pomeranian Voivodeship (north-west Poland)
Sitno, Gmina Barlinek in West Pomeranian Voivodeship (north-west Poland)
Sitno, Szczecinek County in West Pomeranian Voivodeship (north-west Poland)
, near Banská Štiavnica, Slovakia
, a hill near Banská Štiavnica, Slovakia